Arndt Lake is a lake in Yosemite National Park, in California.

Arndt Lake was named for Alvin Arndt, of the U.S. Army.

See also
List of lakes in California

References

Lakes of Tuolumne County, California
Lakes of the Sierra Nevada (United States)
Lakes of Yosemite National Park